Miles Maclagan (born 23 September 1974) is a Zambia born British tennis coach and former professional tennis player. He formerly coached British No.1s Laura Robson and Andy Murray.

Maclagan partnered Tim Henman successfully in the Davis Cup against Thailand, a match he called the moment of his life, and helping Great Britain into the World Group.

Early life
He was born in Zambia to Scottish parents but moved to Harare, Zimbabwe when he was six years old.  Maclagan primarily grew up in Harare. He regularly competed against Wayne Black.

Tennis career
He left Zimbabwe in 1988 to pursue tennis in the United Kingdom. He reached a highest ranking of 172 in singles and 200 in doubles. He played in three Davis Cup ties for Great Britain, making his debut against Slovakia in 1995 and coming out of retirement to partner Tim Henman to victory against Thailand at the Birmingham NIA in 2002. At Wimbledon in 1999, Maclagan managed to take a two set to love lead against Boris Becker, and had three match points on Becker's serve in the fourth set, before eventually losing in five sets.

His last match was at Wimbledon 2003 where he lost to Alex Kim in the first round.

Coaching
As a coach he worked with doubles specialists such as Wayne Black and Kevin Ulyett and was part of their team as they went on to win the Australian Open Doubles title in 2005. He subsequently continued to coach the pairing of Kevin Ullyett and Paul Hanley after Wayne Black retired. At the end of 2007 he was invited to join up with fellow Scot and British No. 1 Andy Murray as part of his coaching team.

On 27 July 2010, Andy Murray and Maclagan split. But he was not out of employment for long as on 17 September he was hired by German player Philipp Kohlschreiber. Between June 2011 to July 2012, he coached former World No.8 Cypriot Marcos Baghdatis.

In June 2013, it was announced that Maclagan would start coaching Laura Robson. However this partnership ended in October 2013 and Sam Stosur chose Maclagan to replace David Taylor as her coach. Stosur ended her coaching relationship with Maclagan in June 2014, ten days before the 2014 Wimbledon. Maclagan began coaching Borna Ćorić in December 2015.

References

External links
 
 
 

1974 births
Living people
People educated at the Royal Grammar School, High Wycombe
Scottish tennis coaches
White Zambian people
White Zimbabwean sportspeople
Zambian people of Scottish descent
Zimbabwean emigrants to the United Kingdom
Zimbabwean people of Scottish descent
Scottish male tennis players
British male tennis players
Zambian emigrants to Zimbabwe